Eric Menyuk (born November 5, 1959) is an American attorney and former actor. He is best known for his brief appearances in the television series Star Trek: The Next Generation as the Traveler. He was originally considered for the role of the android Data, which was eventually given to Brent Spiner. After retiring from his acting career, he retrained to become an attorney and represents children with disabilities and specializes in children's education rights.

Acting career
Menyuk was in the running to play the android character Data in Star Trek: The Next Generation. A memo from John Pike to John Ferrard dated April 13, 1987, listed Menyuk as one of several actors who were in contention for the role, also including Mark Lindsay Chapman, Kevin Peter Hall, and Kelvin Han Yee. Brent Spiner was eventually chosen for the role over Menyuk.

He was subsequently cast in the role of the Traveler, first appearing in the first season in the episode "Where No One Has Gone Before" and returning in the fourth-season episode "Remember Me" and season seven's "Journey's End". To portray the character, he had to undergo a three-hour make-up process on each day of shooting, including prosthetics applied to his face and to both hands  to reduce the number of fingers shown. He later remarked that although he respected the work of Michael Westmore, he disliked the prosthetics on his hands and went out of his way during shooting to hide them. Following his appearances on Star Trek, he has appeared on the convention circuit, including Star Trek-themed cruises on Carnival Cruise Lines.

Personal life
He is an attorney, having graduated from Loyola Law School, Los Angeles, in 1998 after he retired from film and television. He and his wife Laurie have a son and a daughter.

Due to his son's special needs, he has moved into the field of law involving children's education rights. He was admitted to the State Bar of California on July 12, 1998. He earned his undergraduate degree from Vassar College in 1981.

Select filmography

Movies
 Ghost Dad (1990) as Clinic Doctor
 Fearless (1993) as Sears Salesman
 The Air Up There (1994) as Mark Collins
 The Babysitter (1995) as Joe
 Thieves (2018) as Boss

TV guest appearances
 Hill Street Blues as Carney (1 episode, 1987)
 The Betty Ford Story (1987) (TV movie) as Jake
 L.A. Law as Roland Burnet (2 episodes, 1987–1989)
 Matlock as Al White (3 episodes, 1987–1994)
 Star Trek: The Next Generation as The Traveler (3 episodes, 1987–1994)
 Cheers as Larry the Mailman (1 episode, 1988)
 Falcon Crest as Dr. Peters (1 episode, 1989)
 thirtysomething as Man #4 (1 episode, 1990)
 Jake and the Fatman (2 episodes, 1990)
 Married... with Children as Black Bob (2 episodes, 1990–1993)
 Night Court as  Pizza Guy (1 episode, 1991)
 Melrose Place as Physician (1 episode, 1993)
 University Hospital as Max Whistler (1 episode, 1995)
 Ellen as Jim Hogan (1 episode, 1996)
 Voice from the Grave (1996) (TV movie) as Nate Bradshaw
 Diagnosis: Murder as Peter (1 episode, 1996)
 L.A. Doctors as Dr. Daniel Dalsky (1 episode, 1998)

Notes

Sources

External links
 
 
 

Living people
American male film actors
American male television actors
People from Brookline, Massachusetts
Male actors from Massachusetts
American lawyers
Vassar College alumni
Loyola Law School alumni
1959 births